VOEA Pangai (P202) was a Pacific Forum patrol vessel operated by Tonga.

Background

Australia provided the patrol vessels free of charge, and helped build port facilities and provide training. This allowed its neighbours to exercise sovereignty over their EEZ, intercept smugglers, poaching fishers, and provide emergency services.

Australia is replacing Pangai and her two sister ships with two larger and more capable Guardian class patrol vessels.

Design

The  vessels displace 162 tonnes, and are built using commercial off-the-shelf (COTS) equipment, instead of more expensive, high-performance, military-grade equipment, to ease the maintenance burden, since local maintenance will be performed in small, isolated shipyards.

Operational history

Pangai was assigned to a peacekeeping mission in Bougainville, in 1994. Tonga's King Tupou VI served in the Navy when he was a prince, and he was Pangais first commanding officer. He was the commanding officer in 1994, during the peacekeeping mission. In 2009, after 20 years of service, Pangai returned to Australia for a major refit.

Pangai provided disaster assistance, following a 2009 tsunami, to Niuafo’ou, and following Tropical Cyclone Winston, in Fiji, in 2016.  In 2016 Pangai participated in a joint exercise with vessels of other nations. In January 2015 Pangai carried volcanologists to study ash eruption from a new volcanic island that surfaced between the islands of Hunga Tonga and Hunga Ha'apai.

In 2017 Pangai found, and rescued, six lost fishermen. Pangai was decommissioned on April 23, 2020, prior to her last voyage to Australia, to be scrapped. A second Guardian-class patrol vessel will complete the replacement program.

References

Pangai
Pacific Forum class patrol vessels
1990 ships